Mary Norwood Rompf (born May 8, 1966) is an American former professional tennis player.

Norwood, who was born and raised in Oklahoma, is the daughter of dermatologist O'Tar Norwood, who was considered a pioneer in the field of hair transplants. She never dropped a set during her high school tennis career and played collegiate tennis for the USC Trojans from 1985 to 1988. A two-time doubles All-American, Norwood was a member of USC's 1985 NCAA championship winning team, with the final against the Miami Hurricanes held on her home court in Oklahoma City.

Following her graduation from USC, Norwood competed on the professional tour and was ranked in the world's top 100 for doubles, peaking at 98 in 1989. As a singles player she had a best ranking of 297 and featured twice in the main draw of the Virginia Slims of Oklahoma, as well as the qualifiers of the 1989 Wimbledon Championships.

Her husband, Bill Rompf, was her childhood coach.

ITF finals

Doubles: 2 (1–1)

References

External links
 
 

1966 births
Living people
American female tennis players
USC Trojans women's tennis players
Tennis people from Oklahoma
Sportspeople from Oklahoma City